Aloysius Wleh Penie (born April 17, 1983) is a Liberian footballer (midfielder) playing currently for LISCR FC. He is also a member of the Liberia national football team.

External links 
 

1983 births
Living people
Liberian footballers
Association football midfielders
Sportspeople from Monrovia
Liberia international footballers